Under the Red Robe is a 1923 American silent historical drama film directed by Alan Crosland based upon the Stanley Weyman novel Under the Red Robe. The film marks the last motion picture appearance by stage actor Robert B. Mantell who plays Cardinal Richelieu and the only silent screen performance of opera singer John Charles Thomas.

The novel was refilmed in the sound era in 1937 as Under the Red Robe directed by Victor Seastrom.

Plot

Cast

Preservation
The film survives complete at the George Eastman House. A Samuel Goldwyn release, it was donated by MGM.

References

External links

1923 films
American silent feature films
Films directed by Alan Crosland
Goldwyn Pictures films
American historical films
Films set in the 1620s
Films set in the 1630s
1920s historical films
American black-and-white films
Cultural depictions of Cardinal Richelieu
1920s American films